Robert Catley (born 1 September 1942) is a former Australian Labor politician.

Catley was born in Wales and received a B.Sc.(econ) (Hons) from the London School of Economics and a PhD from the Australian National University.  He was subsequently a lecturer and senior lecturer in International Relations at the University of Adelaide, a professor of Political Science at the University of Delaware and the University of Otago and professor of Governance and Head of the School of Business at Charles Darwin University (formerly Northern Territory University). He also worked as a ministerial consultant.  He was elected to the House of Representatives seat of Adelaide at the 1990 election, narrowly defeating Liberal incumbent Mike Pratt. A redistribution ahead of the 1993 election pushed his seat to the south, adding Liberal-friendly territory south of the city centre, cutting his margin from an already slender 3.7 percent to an extremely marginal 1.7 percent. It did not help matters that voters were angry at the state Labor government over the collapse of the State Bank of South Australia, These factors led to his defeat by Liberal challenger Trish Worth at the 1993 election.

Professor Catley was Head of the University of Newcastle's Central Coast School of Business at its Ourimbah Campus. He has now retired and spends his days sailing, caravanning, and in the gym.

Notes

Australian Labor Party members of the Parliament of Australia
Members of the Australian House of Representatives for Adelaide
Members of the Australian House of Representatives
1942 births
Living people
Academic staff of the University of Otago
Australian political scientists
20th-century Australian politicians